

Sovereign states

A
 Abazinia – Abazinia
 Aceh – Aceh Sultanate 
Adal – Adal Sultanate 
 Ahmadnagar – Ahmadnagar Sultanate 
 Ahom – Ahom Kingdom
Airgíalla
Ailech
Aïr – Terene Sultanate of Aïr (to 1500) 
  Ajuran – Ajuran Sultanate 
  Ağ Qoyunlu – Ağ Qoyunlu Confederation 
 Alodia – Alodia 
 Andorra – Principality of Andorra 
 Aragon – Kingdom of Aragon 
  Astrakhan – Khanate of Astrakhan 
 Ava – Kingdom of Ava 
Avar – Avar Khanate 
 Ayutthaya – Ayutthaya Kingdom 
  Aztec – Aztec Empire 
 Tenochtitlan
  Texcoco
  Tlacopan

B
 Bamum – Kingdom of Bamum 
 Banu Sulaym
 Bahmani – Bahmani Sultanate  
 Bastar – Bastar State 
 Benin – Benin Empire 
  Bengal – Sultanate of Bengal 
 Berar – Berar Sultanate 
 Bidar – Bidar Sultanate 
 Bijapur – Adil Shahi dynasty of the Bijapur Sultanate 
 Bikaner 
 Bonoman 
 Borgu – Kingdom of Borgu 
  Bornu – Bornu Empire 
  Brunei – Bruneian Sultanate 
 Buganda – Kingdom of Buganda 
 Bundi – Bundi State
 Butua – Kingdom of Butua 
  Butuan – Rajahnate of Butuan 
 Bunyoro – Kingdom of Bunyoro-Kitara

C
 Caboloan 
  Cambodia 
 Chamba – Chamba State 
 Champa – Chăm Pa 
 China – Empire of the Great Ming  
 Chutiya – Chutiya Kingdom 
 Circassia 
  Clandeboye
  Cospaia - Republic of Cospaia 
 Cutch – Cutch State

D
 Damot – Kingdom of Damot
 Đại Việt
 Dawro – Kingdom of Dawro
  Delhi – Delhi Sultanate 
 Demak – Sultanate of Demak 
 Denkyira 
 Desmond – Kingdom of Desmond 
  Denmark – Kingdom of Denmark 
 Dizak – Principality of Dizak
 Dulkadirids – Beylik of Dulkadir

E
  – Kingdom of England 
 Ethiopia – Ethiopian Empire

F
  Fermanagh 
  – Kingdom of France

G
 Gajapati – Gajapati dynasty, Odisha 
 Garhwal – Kingdom of Garhwal 
  – Republic of Genoa 
 Gowa – Sultanate of Gowa 
 Great Fulo – Empire of Great Fulo 
  Golden Horde – Golden Horde
  Gujarat – Gujarat Sultanate

H
  Hanthawaddy – Hanthawaddy Kingdom 
 Hausa Kingdoms
 Hawwara
  
  Hungary – Kingdom of Hungary

I
 Igala – Kingdom of Igala 
  Imereti – Kingdom of Imereti 
  Inca – Inca Empire 
  – Iroquois Confederacy

J
 Jaffna – Kingdom of Jaffna 
 Jailolo – Sultanate of Jailolo 
 Jaintia – Kingdom of Jaintia 
 Jaisalmer – Kingdom of Jaisalmer 
 Janjero – Kingdom of Janjero 
  Japan – Ashikaga Shogunate 
 Jolof – Jolof Empire 
 Joseon – Kingdom of Great Joseon 
 Jumla – Kingdom of Jumla

K
  Kabardia – Princedom of Kabardia 
 Kachari – Kingdom of Kachari 
 Kaffa – Kingdom of Kaffa 
  Kakheti – Kingdom of Kakheti 
 Kakongo – Kingdom of Kakongo 
 Kalahandi – Kalahandi State 
 Kamata – Kingdom of Kamata
 Kandy – Kingdom of Kandy 
  Kangleipak – Kangleipak State
 Kangra – Kingdom of Kangra
 Kanker – Kanker State 
 Kartli – Kingdom of Kartli 
 Kashmir – Shah Mir Dynasty of Kashmir
 Kazakh – Kazakh Khanate 
  Kazan – Khanate of Kazan 
 Khachen – Principality of Khachen 
 Kilwa – Kilwa Sultanate
  Knights Hospitaller – Order of Saint John 
 Kongo – Kingdom of Kongo 
  – Kingdom of Kotte 
 Kumaon – Kingdom of Kumaon 
 Kutai – Kutai Kartanegara Sultanate 
 Kwararafa – Kwararafa Confederacy

L
 Ladakh – Namgyal dynasty of Ladakh
 Lan Na – Lanna Kingdom 
 Lan Xang
  Lithuania – Grand Duchy of Lithuania 
 Luwu – Kingdom of Luwu

M
 Madja-as – Confederation of Madja-as 
 Magh Luirg
  Majapahit – Majapahit Empire 
 Malacca – The Malay Sultanate of Malacca 
  Maldives – Sultanate of the Maldives 
 Mali – Mali Empire 
 Malwa – Malwa Sultanate 
  Mamluk – Mamluk Sultanate of Cairo 
 Mandara – Kingdom of Mandara
 Mankessim – Kingdom of Mankessim 
 Maravi – Kingdom of Maravi 
 Marwar – Kingdom of Marwar 
 Mayas – Maya civilization
 Maynila – Kingdom of Maynila
 Medri Bahri – Land of the Sea 
 Mewar – Mewar Kingdom 
 Mewat – Mewat State 
 Moghulistan
  Morocco – Wattasid dynasty of Morocco 
 Mossi Kingdoms
 Mrauk U – Kingdom of Mrauk U 
 Muisca Confederation 
  Muscovy – Grand Duchy of Muscovy 
 Mustang – Kingdom of Mustang 
 Mutapa – Kingdom of Mutapa

N
 Namayan - Kingdom of Namayan 
  – Kingdom of Naples 
  Navarre – Kingdom of Navarre 
 Nepal – Malla dynasty of Nepal 
  Nogai – Nogai Horde 
  Noli – Republic of Noli 
 Nri – Kingdom of Nri 
 Nupe – Kingdom of Nupe

O
 Oirat – Four Oirat
  Oman – Imamate of Oman 
  Osraige 
  Ottoman Empire 
 Oyo – Oyo Empire

P
 Pagaruyung – Kingdom of Pagaruyung 
  
 Patna – Patna State 
  Poland – Kingdom of Poland 
  – Kingdom of Portugal 
 Prome – Kingdom of Prome 
  Pskov – Republic of Pskov

R
  – Republic of Ragusa 
 Ramazanids – Emirate of Ramadan 
 Rapa Nui – Kingdom of Rapa Nui 
 Rwanda – Kingdom of Rwanda 
  Ryazan – Principality of Ryazan 
  Ryukyu – Ryukyu Kingdom

S
 Saloum – Kingdom of Saloum 
  Samtskhe – Samtskhe Atabegate 
 Samudera Pasai – Samudera Pasai Sultanate 
  San Marino – Republic of San Marino 
 Saudeleur – Saudeleur dynasty 
  Scotland – Kingdom of Scotland 
  Senarica – Senarica Republic 
  Shan States 
 Shewa – Sultanate of Shewa 
 Shilluk – Shilluk Kingdom
 Sibir – Khanate of Sibir 
  Sindh – Samma dynasty of Sindh 
 Songhai – Songhai Empire 
 Suket – Suket State 
 Sunda – Kingdom of Sunda 
  Sweden – Kingdom of Sweden

T
 Tarascan state 
  Ternate – Sultanate of Ternate 
  Teutonic Knights – State of the Teutonic Order 
  Thomond – Kingdom of Thomond
 Tibet, Phagmodrupa – Phagmodrupa dynasty of Tibet 
 Tibet, Rinpungpa – Rinpungpa dynasty of Tibet 
  Tidore – Sultanate of Tidore 
  Timurid Empire 
  Tlaxcala – Confederacy of Tlaxcala 
  Tlemcen – Zayyanid Kingdom of Tlemcen 
 Tondo – Tundun 
 Tonga – Tu'i Tonga Empire 
 Tunjurs – Tunjur Kingdom 
  Tunis – Sultanate of Tunis 
  Tyrconnell  
  Tyrone
  Twipra – Kingdom of Twipra

U
  Uí Maine
 Usfurids – Usfurid dynasty

V
  Venice – Most Serene Republic of Venice 
  Vijayanagara – Vijayanagara Empire

W
 Warsangali – Warsangali Sultanate 
 Wehali – Sultanate of Wehali
 Welayta – Kingdom of Welayta

Y
 Yemen – Tahirid dynasty of Yemen 
 Yuan – Northern Yuan

Z
 Zapotec – Zapotec Empire

Holy Roman Empire
The Holy Roman Empire was a highly decentralized collection of polities. A comprehensive list of all of its anachronistic components has been made at List of states in the Holy Roman Empire, and would be much too large to fit here.

  Austria – Archduchy of Austria 
  Bavaria – Duchy of Bavaria 
  Bohemia – Kingdom of Bohemia 
  Brandenburg – Margraviate of Brandenburg 
  Electoral Palatinate – County Palatine of the Rhine 
  – Republic of Florence 
  Lorraine – Duchy of Lorraine 
  – Duchy of Savoy 
  Saxony – Electorate of Saxony 
  Switzerland – Swiss Confederacy

Crowns and Unions
Crowns were composite monarchies composed of multiple countries under one ruler.

 

 Polish–Lithuanian union 

 Spain 
 Aragon – Crown of Aragon

  – Crown of Castile

Non-Sovereign Territories

England
  Wales  – Principality of Wales

Gujarat
 Khandesh – Faruqi dynasty of the Khandesh Sultanate

Imereti
  Guria  – Principality of Guria 
  Svaneti  – Principality of Svaneti

Ottoman Empire
  Crimean Khanate – Crimean Khanate  
  – Principality of Wallachia

Poland
  – Principality of Moldavia

Portugal
  Azores 
  Brazil 
  Ceuta 
  Portuguese Gold Coast 
  Portuguese Mozambique 
  Príncipe 
  São Tomé 
  Tangier

Spain (Crown of Castile and Crown of Aragon)
  Canary Islands – Kingdom of the Canary Islands 
 Mellila – Mellila

Sunda
  Cirebon – Sultanate of Cirebon

Vijayanagara
 Calicut – Kingdom of Kozhikode  
 Mysore – Kingdom of Mysore

References

1500
Lists of sovereign states by century
16th century-related lists